WAYS is a sports radio station in Myrtle Beach, South Carolina. It is owned by Cumulus Media. Its studios are located on U.S. Highway 17 in Murrells Inlet, South Carolina, and its transmitter is located in the station's city of license, Conway, South Carolina.

History
WAYS originally signed on February 23, 1977 as WJAL. That August, the call sign became WJXY, a call sign that stayed with the station for many years. WJXY was a daytime-only country music station in the 1970s. An FM sister station at 93.9 was added around 1990, at which time the AM switched to Southern gospel. In 1995, the format changed to adult standards, with most of the music coming from the AM Only satellite format. By this time, the station had a limited nighttime signal.

In Fall 1999, Hurricane Floyd damaged WJXY's studios and transmitter site and forced WJXY-FM, WXJY and WSEA to move to the WSYN/WDAI studios near Inlet Square Mall. At the time, WJXY aired Conway High School football; those games moved to WRNN-FM. WJXY was off the air for several months. Early in 2000, the station was back, but not in stereo. Many listeners had complained.

The station was assigned the WIQB call letters by the Federal Communications Commission on November 16, 2000. For a time, WIQB aired the same programming as oldies WSYN.

On February 15, 2003, WIQB became part of "The Team" all sports format along with WJXY-FM.

On April 30, 2010, WIQB switched to southern gospel and changed its letters to WHSC.

On March 5, 2012, WHSC became the new Myrtle Beach affiliate of Fox Sports Radio. Dan Patrick would air live in the market rather than on tape, and Jim Rome would follow. WHSC became the new station for the Myrtle Beach Pelicans.

The station changed its call sign to WRWM on December 26, 2017, and to WAYS on February 13, 2020.

Translator

References

External links

AYS
Sports radio stations in the United States
Cumulus Media radio stations
Radio stations established in 1977
1977 establishments in South Carolina
Fox Sports Radio stations